The 2016 Wales rugby union tour of New Zealand was a rugby union tour of New Zealand by the Wales national team in June 2016. The tour saw the Welsh side play four matches: three test matches against New Zealand and one match against the Chiefs of Super Rugby.

In the history of matches between these two sides until this three-match test series, New Zealand has won 90% (27 matches) of encounters between them, with Wales' 10% (3 matches) all having occurred before 1954.

Fixtures

Squads
Note: Ages, caps and clubs are as per 18 June, the first test match of the tour.

Wales
On 10 May, Warren Gatland named a 35-man squad for their June 3-test series against New Zealand, pre-tour test against England and the mid week match against the Chiefs.

On 29 May, after injury to Dan Lydiate in the England warm-up match, Ellis Jenkins was called up to the squad to replace Lydiate.

On 7 June, Aaron Jarvis was called up to the squad as injury cover for Paul James. Jarvis later became a permanent replacement after James failed to recover from his injury.

On 11 June, Aled Davies joined the squad as an injury replacement for Lloyd Williams.

Following the first test, Keelan Giles and Rhys Patchell were called up to the squad as injury cover.

Coaching team:
 Head coach:  Warren Gatland
 Backs/attack coach:  Rob Howley
 Forwards coach:  Robin McBryde
 Defence coach:  Shaun Edwards

‡ – Denotes dual contracted players.

New Zealand
New Zealand's 32-man squad for the 2016 June international test series against Wales. Tom Franklin and TJ Perenara are also included as temporary injury cover for Sam Whitelock and Tawera Kerr-Barlow.

On 31 May 2016, George Moala was called up to the squad as an injury replacement for Charlie Ngatai.

Coaching team:
 Head coach:  Steve Hansen
 Attack coach:  Ian Foster
 Forwards coach:  Mike Cron
 Defence coach:  Wayne Smith

Matches

Old Mutual Wealth Cup

Notes:
 Ollie Devoto, Ellis Genge, Teimana Harrison and Tommy Taylor (all England) made their international debuts.

First Test

Notes:
 Alun Wyn Jones became the fifth Welsh player to earn their 100th cap.
 Ardie Savea and Seta Tamanivalu (both New Zealand) and Ellis Jenkins (Wales) made their international debuts.
 There was no replacement issued for George North when he was taken off injured at the end of the game, Wales played with 14 players.

Chiefs

Notes:
 Ellis Jenkins was named to start, but was withdrawn from the team after failing to recover from injury and was replaced with Sam Warburton.
 Bench players Gareth Anscombe and Ross Moriarty was pulled out of the team moments before kick-off due to injury and replaced by Taulupe Faletau and Jamie Roberts.

Second Test

Notes:
 Israel Dagg and Ben Smith (New Zealand) earned their 50th test cap.

Third Test

Notes:
 Elliot Dixon, Liam Squire and Ofa Tu'ungafasi (all New Zealand) made their international debuts.
 Brodie Retallick and Aaron Smith (both New Zealand) earned their 50th test caps.

See also
2016 mid-year rugby union internationals
History of rugby union matches between New Zealand and Wales

References

2016
2015–16 in Welsh rugby union
2016 rugby union tours
2016 in New Zealand rugby union
2016
History of rugby union matches between New Zealand and Wales